SPSS may refer to:

 SPSS, SPSS Statistics (formerly known as Statistical Package for the Social Sciences), computer software
 SPSS Inc., company
 Narco sub, self-propelled semi-submersible
 Science Planning and Scheduling System, module of the Hubble Space Telescope
 Special State Protection Service of Georgia, the state protection agency of Georgia

Organizations
 Sree Pushpakabrahmana Seva Sangham, Kerala, India

Schools
 St. Paul's Secondary School, Hong Kong
 St. Peter's Secondary School (disambiguation)
 South Peace Secondary School, Dawson Creek, British Columbia